The Price of Fame is the fifth studio album by American rapper Bow Wow. The album was released on December 19, 2006 through LBW Entertainment and Columbia Records. The production on the album was primarily handled by Jermaine Dupri, Nitti, Lil Ronnie and R. Kelly. The album also features guest appearances by Chris Brown, Johntá Austin, Pimp C, T-Pain, Lil Wayne and many others.

The Price of Fame received generally positive reviews from music critics and was a commercial success. The album debuted at number six on the US Billboard 200 chart, selling 262,000 copies in the first week. A month later the album was certified gold by the Recording Industry Association of America (RIAA) in January 2007.

Singles
The first single from the album was "Shortie Like Mine" featuring Chris Brown and Johntá Austin; released on October 3, 2006; it peaked at number nine on the US Billboard Hot 100 chart. The second single was "Outta My System" featuring T-Pain; released on February 13, 2007, it peaked at number 22 on the chart. The third single "I Don't Know About That". The fourth and final single was supposed to be "4 Corners", but was never released as a single and a video was not shot. Every track on the album is edited, although explicit versions of songs such as "Shortie Like Mine", "4 Corners", and "I Don't Know About That" were recorded.

Commercial performance
The Price of Fame debuted at number six on the US Billboard 200 chart, selling 262,000 copies in its first week. This became Bow Wow's fourth US top-ten album. On January 23, 2007, the album was certified gold by the Recording Industry Association of America (RIAA) for sales of over 500,000 copies in the United States. As of November 26, 2008, the album has sold 600,000 copies in the US.

Track listing

 (*) Denotes co-producer.

Notes
Track 2, "Price of Fame", featuring uncredited vocals by Young Jinsu.
Track 5, "How You Move It", featuring uncredited vocals by Da Brat.

Sample credits
"4 Corners", contains excerpts from "Big Pimpin'" as performed by Jay-Z featuring UGK, and written by Shawn Carter, Chad Butler, Bernard Freeman, Timothy Mosley and Kyambo Joshua.
"Outta My System" (feat. Johntá Austin and T-Pain), samples of "Hollywood" as performed by Rick James, and written by James Johnson, Jr.
"How You Move It", contains interpolations from the composition "Disco Inferno" as performed by 50 Cent, and written by Curtis Jackson, Teraike Crawford and Phillip Pitts.
"Tell Me", contains interpolations from the composition "When Will I See You Smile Again?" by Bell Biv DeVoe, and written by Timmy Gatling and Alton "Wokie" Stewart.

Bonus track
The album was released with the bonus track "I'm a Flirt" (featuring R. Kelly). This was due to be the album's second single, but it was changed to "Outta My System". The remix to "I'm A Flirt", with T.I. and T-Pain, is on R. Kelly's 2007 album Double Up and does not include Bow Wow. On downloadable music sites and YouTube, Bow Wow's verse was added to the beginning of the remix and is credited as Bow Wow & R. Kelly featuring T.I. and T-Pain.

Charts

Weekly charts

Year-end charts

Certifications

References

2006 albums
Bow Wow (rapper) albums
Columbia Records albums
Albums produced by Bryan-Michael Cox
Albums produced by Jermaine Dupri
Albums produced by No I.D.